The athletics competition at the 2007 European Youth Summer Olympic Festival was held from 23 to 27 July. The events took place in Belgrade, Serbia. Boys and girls born 1990 or 1991 or later participated 34 track and field events, with similar programmes for the sexes with the exception of no steeplechase or hammer throw event for girls.

The event was held shortly after the 2007 World Youth Championships in Athletics. Mykyta Nesterenko (discus throw) and Darya Klishina (long jump) were the only two reigning world youth champions to come and win at the European competition. Three athletes completed individual doubles: Ramil Guliyev and Eliza Vildanova did a short sprint double in the girls' and boys' divisions, respectively, and Daniela Fetcere claimed both the girls' middle-distance running titles.

Several of the participants later went on to reach the pinnacle of the sport. Klishina became the European indoor champion in 2013, but minor medallists also went on to greater acclaim: Ekaterina Zavyalova won an Olympic medal in 2012, Ivana Španović was a 2013 World Championships medallist, and discus thrower Sandra Perković (runner-up here) went on to win Olympic, World and European titles.

Medal summary

Men

Women

References

Results
2007 European Youth Games. World Junior Athletics History. Retrieved on 2014-11-22.

External links
Athletics results from GBR Athletics

2007 European Youth Summer Olympic Festival
European Youth Summer Olympic Festival
2007
International athletics competitions hosted by Serbia
International sports competitions hosted by Serbia